Albert Schweitzer is a 1957 American biographical documentary about Albert Schweitzer directed by Jerome Hill. It won the Academy Award for Best Documentary Feature for 1958.

Cast
 Fredric March – Voice of Albert Schweitzer
 Albert Schweitzer – Himself
 Phillip Eckert – Young Albert Schweitzer
 Adele Woytt – Albert Schweitzer's Mother
 Burgess Meredith – Narrator

See also
 List of American films of 1957
 Jerome Hill

References

External links

, posted by the Jerome Foundation
Excerpt on YouTube

1957 films
West German films
American documentary films
German documentary films
Films directed by Jerome Hill
Best Documentary Feature Academy Award winners
1957 documentary films
Films about Nobel laureates
Biographical films about physicians
Cultural depictions of Albert Schweitzer
1950s English-language films
1950s American films
1950s German films